Appropedia is a wiki-based website that contains content relating to poverty, environmental degradation and international development.

Purpose 
Appropedia helps people share information and collaborate on projects to address poverty, international development, and environmental sustainability.

Nomenclature 
Appro means "Appropriate Technology". Despite "pedia" in the title, the site is not an encyclopedia, but a collection of various types of content, including original research.

History 
Appropedia was founded in April 2006. 

In 2007, three of the founders created the Appropedia Foundation and registered it as a not for profit in California.

Site organization 
The website is organized into portals that are groups of articles arranged by topics. Topics include construction, energy, food & agriculture, health, and water. Like other wiki based websites, the content can be navigated in multiple ways, using tags to indicate themes.

Content is made under the Creative Commons Attribution-Share Alike 3.0 license.

Comparison with Wikipedia 

The rules for content acceptance and editing on Appropedia vary from Wikipedia due to having different goals. For example:

 While Wikipedia requires verifiability, Appropedia prefers verifiability but does not demand it.
 While Wikipedia prohibits original research, Appropedia encourages it.
 While Wikipedia requires a neutral point of view, Appropedia encourages a neutral point of view, but notably the content tends to be uploaded by people with affiliations to the topic.

Notable uses 
Ontario man, Aren Page, used Appropedia to help him design an off-grid residential vehicle.

Michigan Technological University faculty Joshua Pearce used Appropedia to share hundreds of designs for cost saving.

References 

Internet properties established in 2006
American websites
Wikis
Technology websites
American environmental websites